Mesalina balfouri is a species of sand-dwelling lizard in the family Lacertidae. The species is endemic to Socotra.

Etymology
The specific name, balfouri, is in honor of Scottish botanist Isaac Bayley Balfour.

Habitat

Reproduction
M. balfouri is oviparous.

References

Further reading
Blanford WT (1881). "Notes on the Lizards collected in Socotra by Prof. I. Bayley Balfour". Proceedings of the Zoological Society of London 1881: 464–469. ("Eremias (Mesalina) balfouri ", new species, pp. 467–469, Figure 2). (in English and Latin).
Bütikofer L, Sacchi R, Pupin F, Pellitteri-Rosa D, Razzetti E, Pella F, Fasola M (2013). "Sexual dimorphism and allometry of the lacertid Mesalina balfouri (Blanford, 1881), endemic to the Archipelago of Socotra (Yemen)". Herpetozoa 25 (3/4): 101–108. (in English, with an abstract in German).
Razzetti E, Sindaco R, Grieco C, Pella F, Ziliani U, Pupin F, Riservato E, Pellitteri-Rosa D, Bütikofer L, Suleiman AS, Al-Aseily BA, Carugati C, Boncompagni E, Fasola M (2011). "Annotated checklist and distribution of the Socotran Archipelago Herpetofauna (Reptilia)". Zootaxa 2826: 1-44. (Mesalina balfouri, p. 14). 

balfouri
Reptiles described in 1881
Taxa named by William Thomas Blanford
Endemic fauna of Socotra